Toby Henry Somerville Pettman (born 11 May 1998) is an English first-class cricketer who plays for Nottinghamshire.

Early life and career 
Pettman was born at Kingston upon Thames in May 1998.  He was educated at Tonbridge School, before going up to Jesus College, Oxford to read classics, graduating in 2020 with a Double First.  While studying at Oxford, Pettman made four appearances in first-class cricket for Oxford University against Cambridge University in The University Matches of 2017, 2018, 2019 and 2020, captaining the side in the 2020 game (the last to have first-class status).  In addition to playing for Oxford University, Pettman also made three first-class appearances for Oxford MCCU against Kent in 2018 and Middlesex and Hampshire in 2019.  In seven first-class matches, Pettman scored 122 runs at an average of 17.42 and a high score of 54 not out, while with his right-arm fast-medium bowling he took 33 wickets at a bowling average of 21.15, twice taking a five wicket haul.  He recorded his best figures of 5 for 19 in The University Match of 2019.

After leaving Oxford in 2020, Pettman was about to start a job in data analytics when he was offered a one-year professional cricket contract by Nottinghamshire coach Peter Moores. He played for the Nottinghamshire 2nd XI in 2021 and then signed another one-year contract for 2022. In November 2021, he was selected for a Marylebone Cricket Club squad to play a tournament in Almería, Spain.

Pettman began the 2022 season once again in the Nottinghamshire 2nd XI. In June 2022, he joined Derbyshire on a short-term loan. Making his County Championship debut against Middlesex at Queen's Park, Chesterfield, he took 3 wickets for 40 runs to record the best bowling figures in Derbyshire's first innings. Later in the month he also played a single Championship game for Kent County Cricket Club as a short-term loan signing to cover for injuries.

Notes and references

External links

1998 births
Living people
People from Kingston upon Thames
People educated at Tonbridge School
Alumni of Jesus College, Oxford
English cricketers
Oxford University cricketers
Oxford MCCU cricketers
Derbyshire cricketers
Kent cricketers
Nottinghamshire cricketers